The Orlando Lutheran Academy was a private, religious school located in Orlando, FL. It served as both a middle and high school, and functioned in a way that was similar to a standard, public, high school. At its high point, it was ranked in the top 3 private schools in Orlando, but is now defunct as a result of financial difficulties incurred during the height of its enrollment. On Sunday, May 23, 2010, the school had their farewell party as a dedication to the school and its alumni.

Classes available

English (I/II/III/IV/AP), 
Mathematics (Integrated Math/Algebra I/Geometry/Algebra II/Pre-Calculus/Consumer Math [dealing with check writing, calculating loans, etc.] and AP Calculus)
Science (Integrated Science, Anatomy & Physiology, Chemistry, Biology, and Physics) 
Social Studies (World History/American History/American Government/Economics)
Physical Education (Team Sports/Weight Lifting/Life Management)
Christian Theology (Old Testament, New Testament, The Synoptic Gospels, and Creation Week/Judgement Day) 
Art (Clay I/II; Art 2D/3D)
Practical Arts (Choir, Band), and Foreign Language (Spanish I/II/III)
Students chose from electives such as: Civil War, Psychology, Christian Apologetics, and Yearbook.

Student opportunity
Students could participate in a number of extracurricular activities, including: basketball, track/field, soccer, football, baseball, golf, student choir, contemporary praise band, weightlifting, drama, and chapel production. Also, dual-enrollment was offered at Valencia Community College which allowed for students to take part in college classes while earning both a high school graduation credit, and a college credit.

Accreditation
Orlando Lutheran Academy was a fully accredited school as recognized by the Southern Association of Colleges and Schools (SACS), the Commission on International and Trans-Regional Accreditation (CITA), the Association of Independent Schools of Florida (AISF), and the National Lutheran School Accreditation organization (NLSA).

School paper
The Crusader Communicator was the official weekly school-to-home newsletter of The Orlando Lutheran Academy which was produced by Carl Schuster.

Notes and references

High schools in Orange County, Florida
Private high schools in Florida
Defunct Lutheran schools
Schools in Orlando, Florida
Private middle schools in Florida
Defunct Christian schools in the United States
2010 disestablishments in Florida
Educational institutions disestablished in 2010